Julian G. Pepperell is an Australian marine biologist and author, and a leading authority on marlin, sailfish, tuna, and sharks.

He is a former president of the Australian Society for Fish Biology (1991–93) and a recipient of the Conservation Award from the International Game Fish Association (1999).

Published works
 Fishes of the Open Ocean: A Natural History and Illustrated Guide (2010) , shortlisted for the Science Writer Award in the 2010 Queensland Premier's Literary Awards.

References

Australian marine biologists
Living people
Year of birth missing (living people)